Isenburg-Wächtersbach was a County of southern Hesse, Germany. It was created in 1673 as a partition of Isenburg-Büdingen, and was mediatised to Isenburg in 1806. In 1865, the Head of this line of the family, Ferdinand Maximilian was raised to the rank of Prince.

Counties of the Holy Roman Empire
House of Isenburg
States and territories established in 1673
 
1673 establishments in the Holy Roman Empire